Cheang may refer to:

 Aloysius Cheang (21st century), Chinese Singaporean information technology executive
 Cheang Pou-Soi (21st century), Hong Kong film director
 Shu Lea Cheang (born 1954), Taiwanese multi-media artist
 Teh Cheang Wan (1928-1986), Chinese Singaporean architect

Cheang is also an alternative form for Zheng (surname)